The Hell Is Real Derby, also known as the Ohio Derby, is a rivalry between the two Major League Soccer (MLS) clubs based in Ohio: the Columbus Crew and FC Cincinnati. Under current MLS regular season scheduling, the series occurs twice per season as both teams are members of the Eastern Conference. The teams first met in 2017 in the U.S. Open Cup before Cincinnati joined MLS in 2019.

Background
On June 15, 1994, MLS announced that Columbus would be home to one of the ten founding members of the new top-flight North American professional soccer league. Cincinnati joined the league in 2019 as an expansion team under the same name as their United Soccer League club, which had started play in 2016, thus creating the first top-flight derby in Ohio. Two weeks after the Cincinnati expansion announcement, the clubs met for the first time with lower-league Cincinnati winning 1–0 in the U.S. Open Cup.

In October 2017, Columbus owner Anthony Precourt threatened to move the team to Austin, Texas, putting the prospect of an MLS rivalry between the two Ohio teams in jeopardy. Precourt's proposed relocation sparked outrage in the American soccer community, creating the #SaveTheCrew movement. After a year of support by fans, rival teams, local businesses, and politicians, the Crew committed to staying in Columbus in November 2018, when the Haslam family (owners of the NFL's Cleveland Browns, which had been the subject of a controversial relocation in the 1990s) purchased the club.

History
The two teams met for the first time in the fourth round of the 2017 U.S. Open Cup, while FC Cincinnati was still a member of the United Soccer League. Cincinnati won the match 1–0 on a goal from Djiby, knocking Columbus out of the tournament and advancing to the quarterfinals.

On August 10, 2019, the two sides played against each other in MLS league play for the first time, ending in a 2–2 draw at Mapfre Stadium. Columbus earned their first win of the series in that season's reverse fixture with a 3–1 victory. The highest-scoring match came in 2021, when the Crew pulled off a late comeback at their new Lower.com Field; holding a 2–1 lead in the 75th minute, FC Cincinnati surrendered two late goals to lose 3–2.

Name

The derby's name was created by fans of both teams in 2017, prior to the first competitive meeting in the U.S. Open Cup. The sign was installed in 2004 on a local farm in Chenoweth by a Kentucky developer who had installed similar religious signs in other states.

Statistics

Match results

† Matches played behind closed doors or reduced capacity due to the COVID-19 pandemic.

‡ Although the match was part of the MLS is Back Tournament, group stage matches count toward regular season MLS statistics.

Eastern Conference standings finishes

• Total: Columbus with 3 higher finishes, FC Cincinnati with 1.

Top goalscorers

Players who played for both clubs

See also
MLS rivalry cups
Bengals–Browns rivalry, American football rivalry between the NFL's two Ohio franchises
Ohio Cup, baseball rivalry between the Cincinnati Reds and the Cleveland Indians of MLB

References

Columbus Crew
FC Cincinnati
Major League Soccer rivalries
Sports in Columbus, Ohio
Sports in Cincinnati
2018 establishments in Ohio